UPN Kids was an American children's programming block that aired on UPN from September 10, 1995 to September 5, 1999. Airing on Sunday mornings, the block aired for one hour (10:00 to 11:00am), then two hours the following year (9:00 to 11:00 a.m., regardless of time zone).

History
UPN Kids launched on September 10, 1995 with a one-hour block of cartoons consisting of Space Strikers and Teknoman. It was a joint partnership between UPN and Saban Entertainment. Unlike NBC, ABC, CBS, Fox and The WB (the latter of which debuted its own children's program block, Kids' WB, the day before UPN Kids made its debut), UPN ran its weekend morning children's programs on Sundays instead of Saturdays. This was likely due to several UPN affiliates in large markets also dually carrying the Fox Kids block for newer Fox stations (especially those of New World Communications; the former Fox affiliates in those markets mainly also retained the Fox Kids schedule) on Saturday mornings, who is not carrying Fox Kids in order to instead expand Saturday morning newscasts or retain other local programming. This eventually proved to be a conflict for UPN, as the more well-known Fox Kids block was given primacy in advertising and promotions by those affiliates (including the continuation of the local children's Fox Kids fan clubs run by those stations) over UPN's unproven children's programming.

On September 8, 1996, UPN Kids expanded the block to 2 hours with four new programs, which consist of Jumanji, The Mouse and the Monster, The Incredible Hulk and Bureau of Alien Detectors. In 1997, UPN incorporated live-action series aimed at teenagers, along with the animated shows targeted at a younger audience, with the addition of reruns of the syndicated dramedy series Sweet Valley High (based on the young adult novels by Francine Pascal) and a new comedy series, Breaker High (focused on a group of students attending a fictionalized Semester at Sea program, which featured a then-unknown Ryan Gosling among its main cast).

In January 1998, UPN began discussions with The Walt Disney Company (owner of rival network ABC) to have the company program a daily two-hour children's block for the network; however attempts to reach a time-lease agreement deal with Disney were called off one week later due to a dispute between Disney and UPN over how the block would be branded and the amount of programming compliant with the Federal Communications Commission's educational programming regulations that Disney would provide for the block. UPN then entered into discussions with then-corporate sister Nickelodeon (both were owned by Viacom). UPN had an agreement with Saban Entertainment – the distributor of Sweet Valley High and Breaker High – to program the Sunday morning block for at least one year shows such as Fantastic Four, Iron Man, X-Men, Spider-Man and His Amazing Friends, Spider-Man and Beetleborgs soon joined the schedule.

In March 1998, UPN resumed discussions with Disney and the following month, The Walt Disney Company agreed to develop a weekday and Sunday morning children's block for the network. A new lineup, which was developed as a companion block to Disney's One Saturday Morning on ABC, was originally announced under the title "Whomptastic" (a title quickly discarded because it was used as an in-universe profanity replacement in Disney's animated series Recess), before being retitled as Disney's One Too. UPN Kids aired for the last time on September 5, 1999, and was replaced by Disney's One Too the following day.

Programming

Former programming

Animated series
 Bureau of Alien Detectors (1996–1997)
 The Incredible Hulk (1996– 1999)
Incredible Hulk & Friends (1998–1999)-Sunday, anthology series - mixed episodes of the following Marvel shows:
The Incredible Hulk 
Fantastic Four
Iron Man
 Jumanji (1996– 1998)
 The Mouse and the Monster (1996–1997)
 Spider-Man (1998–1999)
 Spider-Man and His Amazing Friends (1998–1999)
 X-Men (1998–1999)

Live-action series
 Sweet Valley High (1997–1998)
 Beetleborgs (1998–1999)

Acquired series
 Breaker High (1997–1998) (live-action)
 Space Strikers (1995-1996)
 Teknoman (1995-1996)

References

 
Children's television networks in the United States
Joint ventures
Television channels and stations established in 1995
Television channels and stations disestablished in 1999
Television networks in the United States
Television programming blocks in the United States